Milko Novaković (born 21 January 1988) is a Serbian-born Montenegrin footballer.

Club career
He played in Serbia for Cement Beočin, Sloga Temerin, Banat Zrenjanin and FK Novi Sad, in Montenegro for Mogren, and Hungarian side Videoton.

International career
He was a member of Montenegro national under-21 football team.

External links
 Profile and stats at Srbijafudbal
 Milko Novaković Stats at Utakmica.rs
 

1988 births
Living people
Footballers from Novi Sad
Association football central defenders
Serbian footballers
Montenegrin footballers
Montenegro under-21 international footballers
FK Cement Beočin players
FK Sloga Temerin players
FK Banat Zrenjanin players
RFK Novi Sad 1921 players
Fehérvár FC players
FK Mogren players
FK Vojvodina players
OFK Grbalj players
FK Javor Ivanjica players
FK BSK Borča players
FC Dacia Chișinău players
FK ČSK Čelarevo players
Serbian First League players
Serbian SuperLiga players
Montenegrin First League players
Moldovan Super Liga players
Montenegrin expatriate footballers
Serbian expatriate footballers
Expatriate footballers in Hungary
Montenegrin expatriate sportspeople in Hungary
Expatriate footballers in Moldova
Montenegrin expatriate sportspeople in Moldova